The Kessler Foundation, established in 1985, is a public charity in the United States supporting people with disabilities.  
Kessler Foundation has its roots in the Kessler Institute, founded in 1949 to improve medical outcomes and employment of people disabled by brain or spinal injury.  Kessler Foundation conducts rehabilitation research with the goal of increasing function for cognition, mobility, and long-term outcomes, including employment, for people with neurological disabilities caused by diseases and injuries of the brain and spinal cord. Kessler Foundation has also distributed millions of dollars to programs that promote the employment of people with disabilities through its Community Employment grants. Kessler Foundation has a full-time staff of 90 individuals, divided between two locations in West Orange, NJ.

History
Over sixty years ago, Dr. Henry H. Kessler founded the Kessler Institute of Rehabilitation; a hospital dedicated to improving the quality of life for people with physical disabilities. Following World War II, the institute served disabled veterans and civilians. In 1951, it received a grant from the State of New Jersey toward a pre-vocational diagnostic unit. The vocational education program for people with physical limitations matched interest and abilities with previous work experience and assisted patients in job placements. Responding to an increased demand for services, in 1961 the Institute expanded from 16 beds to 48 beds. Through the 1970s and 1980s, the institution continued to expand both in terms of patient capacity as well as outpatient facilities.

In August 2003, the Henry H. Kessler Foundation sold Kessler Institute for Rehabilitation to Select Medical Corporation. The Foundation continues its focus on rehabilitation research, education and community programs. The Foundation continues to distribute funds to support the scientific research at the Kessler Research Center and employment programs that help people with disabilities return to work.

Research
Kessler Foundation's research division is called Kessler Foundation Research Center. It includes 90 staff members who work in such research areas as neuropsychology, neuroscience, outcomes assessment, traumatic brain injury, spinal cord injury, stroke, rehabilitation engineering, gait analysis and motor control.

Programs

Think First
Kessler Foundation's "Think First" is a community health education program presented to New Jersey school children in grades K-12. The program serves to educate children and teens about safety and injury prevention and promotes greater respect for people with disabilities. The information is presented by a survivor of spinal cord injury who delivers safety messages and shares his or her personal experiences. The program is the state chapter of a national "Think First" network.

Wheelblazers
WheelBlazers is a wheelchair racing team for individuals with physical disabilities. The team gives participants the opportunity to be a part of a competitive, organized sports team. Throughout the summer and fall the team practices regularly and participants in regional races.

Grants
Kessler Foundation distributes external grants. In 2008 and 2009, Kessler Foundation granted about $500,000 to the Arthur & Friends project, which trains developmentally disabled workers in how to grow produce in hydroponic greenhouses.
 
In 2018, the grantmaking division of Kessler Foundation provided $2,186,673 in direct grants to various organizations. In 2019, it provided $2,689,734. 
 
In 2021, Kessler Foundation funded a cafe in Woodbridge, NJ, that trains young adults with special needs in food service industry work.

The Community Employment Grant program supports projects, programs, pilot initiatives, and creative solutions that work toward improving the employment and career advancement of New Jersey citizens with disabilities. Grants are for one year and range from $25,000 to $50,000 each.

Sponsorships
Kessler Foundation sponsors the Telecommuting Pilot Project with $438,687. Run by the Jewish Vocational Service (JVS), the program matches individuals with severe physical disabilities who can work from their homes with employers who need services and support. More than 25 individuals have undergone job and vocational placement assessment and have received vocational counseling and technical support as well as job placement assistance.

On October 12–15, 2008, Kessler Foundation co-sponsored the International Conference on Behavioral Health and Traumatic Brain Injury hosted by St. Joseph's Regional Medical Center. The conference brought together medical and behavioral health experts from around the world to address the challenges of rehabilitating Iraqi war veterans with traumatic brain injury and post-traumatic stress disorder. Attendees included experts in medicine, psychology, psychiatry, neuropsychology, neurosurgery, epidemiology, public policy and rehabilitation from the U.S., Europe and South America. The conference's objective is to formulate a report for Congress outlining steps the government should take to respond to the needs of individuals suffering from post-traumatic stress disorder and traumatic brain injury.

Books
Kessler, Dr. Henry H. Kessler (1968) The Knife is Not Enough. New York: W. W. Norton & Company.

References

External links
 - Kessler Foundation 
 - Kessler Medical Rehabilitation Research and Education Center

Medical and health foundations in the United States
Charities based in New Jersey